Sar Ghashk (also known as Sar-e Ghashak) is a village in Javaran Rural District, Hanza District, Rabor County, Kerman Province, Iran. At the 2006 census, its population was 57, in 16 families.

References 

Populated places in Rabor County